Hashemabad, also rendered as Hashimabad, may refer to:
Hashemabad, East Azerbaijan
Hashemabad, Kharameh, Fars Province
Hashemabad, Marvdasht, Fars Province
Hashemabad, Golestan
Hashemabad, Hormozgan
Hashemabad, Ilam
Hashemabad, Bon Rud, Isfahan County, Isfahan Province
Hashemabad, Jolgeh, Isfahan County, Isfahan Province
Hashemabad Air Force Base, Isfahan County, Isfahan Province
Hashemabad, Nain, Isfahan Province
Hashemabad, Kerman
Hashemabad, Fahraj, Kerman Province
Hashemabad, Shahr-e Babak, Kerman Province
Hashemabad, Kermanshah
Hashemabad, Lorestan
Hashemabad, Chenaran, Razavi Khorasan Province
Hashemabad, Mashhad, Razavi Khorasan Province
Hashemabad, Zeberkhan, Nishapur County, Razavi Khorasan Province
Hashemabad-e Soltani, Nishapur County, Razavi Khorasan Province
Hashemabad, Sabzevar, Razavi Khorasan Province
Hashemabad, Khash, Sistan and Baluchestan Province
Hashemabad, West Azerbaijan
Hashemabad, Chahak, Khatam County, Yazd Province
Hashemabad, Fathabad, Khatam County, Yazd Province
Hashemabad, Taft, Yazd Province